Xiluo Township or Siluo Township is an urban township in Yunlin County, Taiwan.

History

The place was originally called Sailei by the native Babuza people, which later become Xiluo by translating from Hokkien to Mandarin. It is also formerly called Lethng after the Chinese colonizers hometown.

Geography
It has a population total of 44,610 and an area of 49.7985 square kilometres.

Administrative divisions
The township comprises 27 villages: Anding, Beitou, Daxin, Dayuan, Dingnan, Futian, Fuxing, Gongguan, Guangfu, Guanghua, Guangxing, Hanguang, Henan, Jiulong, Luchang, Qizuo, Tungxing, Wucuo, Xianan, Xinan, Xinfeng, Yongan, Zhaoan, Zhengxing, Zhenxing, Zhonghe and Zhongxing.

Economy
Xiluo Township is one of the most important vegetable growing areas in Taiwan.

Tourist attractions

 Archway of Ci Kan Martial Art
 Ci Kan of Siluo
 Jhen Wen Academy
 Master A-Shan's Cemetery
 Xiluo Bridge
 Xiluo Fuxing Temple
 Xiluo Guangfu Temple
 Xiluo Theater
 Yanping Street

Notable natives
 Jeff Chang, singer
 Lee Chia-fen, educator and politician
 Liao Hsiao-chun, television presenter
 Chung Jen-pi, potehi puppeteer
 Thomas Liao, former activist

References

External links

 Siluo Township Office, Yunlin County

Townships in Yunlin County
Taiwan placenames originating from Formosan languages